David Ramón Sánchez Palomares (7 May 1935 – 4 March 2016) was a Venezuelan poet, born in Escuque. In 1975 received the National Prize for Literature; in 2006 the first Víctor Valera Mora International Prize for Poetry; and in 2010 the Ibero-America Award for Literature.

For 1952 worked as teacher in the San Cristóbal Normal School. Six years later, graduated as Professor of Literature in the Pedagogical Institute of Caracas. Taught in secondary schools in Nueva Esparta and Trujillo states, also in the capital city, Caracas. In the University of the Andes graduates in Literature.

His first poetry book: El Reino (The Kingdom) (1958), is sponsored by the intellectual group Sardio. In 1963 was part of the aesthetic movement El Techo de la Ballena, and participates as editor in the magazine Rayado sobre el Techo. In 1964, in the city of Boconó, is published his book Paisano. The same year come up with the poem El ahogado (The drowned), with the art of Mateo Manaure. In 1965 was awarded with the Municipal Poetry Prize of Caracas by Paisano, and presents Honras Fúnebres (Funeral).

For the celebration of the 400th anniversary of Caracas, wrote the poem Santiago de León de Caracas (1967), that recreates moments of city's history. In 1975 received the  National Prize for Literature for Adiós Escuque (Goodbye Escuque). In 1991, the first Mariano Picón Salas Biennial of literature, tribute his career. In 1997 the VI Poetry Week, organized by the Juan Antonio Pérez Bonalde Foundation, is also a homage Palomares.

On 14 June 2001, earned an honorary degree from the University of the Andes, along with poets Rafael Cadenas and Juan Sánchez Peláez. He resided in the city of Mérida until his death on 4 March 2016.

Works

Poetry
El Reino. Caracas: Sardio, 1958
Paisano. Boconó: Ateneo de Boconó, 1964
El ahogado. Caracas: Editorial Arte, 1964
Honras fúnebres. Caracas: Poesía de Venezuela, 1965
Santiago de León de Caracas. Caracas: Editions for the 400th anniversary of Caracas, 1967 
El vientecito suave del amanecer con los primeros aromas. Boconó: Ateneo de Boconó, 1969
Poesía (1958-1965). Caracas: Pedagogical Institute, 1973
Adiós a Escuque. Mérida: University of the Andes, 1974 
Poesía. Caracas: Monte Ávila Editores, 1977
Elegía 1830. Mérida: Municipal Council / University of the Andes, 1980
El viento y la piedra. Mérida: Grespan company, 1984
Mérida, elogio de sus ríos. Mérida: Municipal Council / University of the Andes, 1985
Alegres provincias: homenaje a Humboldt. Caracas: Fundarte, 1988
Trilogía. Madrid: Ediciones de Cultura Hispánica, 1990
Mérida, fábula de cuatro ríos. Mérida: Academy of Mérida, 1994
Lobos y halcones. Caracas: Tierra de Gracia Editores, 1997
Ramón Palomares. Antología poética. Caracas: Monte Ávila Editores, 2004
El canto del pájaro en la piedra. Salamanca: Camino de la Lengua Castellana Foundation and Venezuelan Ministry of Education, 2004
El reino de Escuque. La Habana: Fondo Editorial Casa de las Américas, 2005
Vuelta a casa. Caracas: Biblioteca Ayacucho, 2006

References

Patricia Guzmán. Ramón Palomares, existir en lo innominado. Prologue to "Vuelta a Casa". Biblioteca Ayacucho, 2006 
Enrique Hernández D'Jesús. Chronology of Ramón Palomares. "Antología poética". Biblioteca Básica de Autores Venezolanos. Monte Ávila Editores, 2004 
Biography of Ramón Palomares - International Poetry Festival of Medellín

People from Trujillo (state)
20th-century Venezuelan poets
Academic staff of the University of the Andes (Venezuela)
1935 births
2016 deaths
21st-century Venezuelan poets
Venezuelan male poets
20th-century male writers
21st-century male writers